Thomas Charles Shields (born August 14, 1964) is an American professional baseball coach and former infielder. Shields was an infielder in Major League Baseball (MLB) from 1992 to 1993 for the Baltimore Orioles and Chicago Cubs. In 2021, Shields was manager of the Wilmington Blue Rocks.

Formerly a coach for the Burlington Royals, Shields was tapped to take over as manager of the Class A-Advanced team in Wilmington, Delaware. The Washington Nationals, the Blue Rocks' parent club, announced his hiring on December 15, 2020. He was dismissed on September 21, 2021, after the Blue Rocks struggled to a 52–64 record.

References

External links

1964 births
Living people
Major League Baseball infielders
Baltimore Orioles players
Chicago Cubs players
St. Louis Cardinals scouts
Minor league baseball managers
Notre Dame Fighting Irish baseball players
Baseball players from Virginia
Sportspeople from Fairfax, Virginia
Buffalo Bisons (minor league) players
Harrisburg Senators players
Iowa Cubs players
Prince William Pirates players
Rochester Red Wings players
Salem Buccaneers players
Watertown Pirates players